Dr Douglas Gerard Arthur Fox (born Putney, July 1893 - died Bristol, September 1978) was an English pianist, organist and music teacher.

Fox was born into a musical family; his father played violin and cello, his mother the piano. His mother may have been a distant relative of Thomas Ravenscroft. In 1902 the family moved to Bristol.

An outstanding organist from a young age, Fox attended Clifton College and the Royal College of Music where he received tuition from Charles Villiers Stanford. From 1912 to 1915 he studied music at Keble College, Oxford, where he was organ scholar. Joining the military during World War I, on 27 August 1917 he was badly injured, and his right arm was amputated from the elbow.

His career as a performing musician was over, and his tutors Hubert Parry and Stanford attempted to  help their pupil re-adjust. Stanford recommended a career as a conductor and teacher.

As a tribute to him, his friend Hugh Allen at New College played an Evensong with only with his left hand and pedals. In 1918 or 1919 Frank Bridge sent him Three improvisations for the left hand for him to practice.

He became the musical director of Bradfield College (1918-1930). In 1922 he became conductor of the Newbury Symphony Orchestra. From 1931 to 1957 he was Head of Music at Clifton College (where one of his pupils was John Sykes and Organist of Great St. Mary's, Cambridge from 1957 to 1963. In 1958 he was awarded the OBE. He died in September 1978.

References

English choral conductors
British male conductors (music)
Alumni of Keble College, Oxford
1893 births
1978 deaths
People educated at Clifton College
English classical organists
British male organists
Alumni of the Royal College of Music
British Army personnel of World War I
20th-century English musicians
19th-century English musicians
Classical pianists who played with one arm
20th-century organists
20th-century British conductors (music)
20th-century classical pianists
20th-century British male musicians
19th-century British male musicians
Male classical organists
Presidents of the Independent Society of Musicians